Gum Stump is an unincorporated community in Boggs Township, Centre County, Pennsylvania,  United States.

The Bellefonte and Snowshoe Railroad switchbacks are located there. The switchbacks are the inspiration for Chuck Yungkurth's model railroad switchbacks.

Gum Stump is the location of Pennsylvania State Game Lands No. 103, an  hunting range maintained by the Pennsylvania Game Commission.

References

External links
Listing of Gum Stump at the Getty Thesaurus of Geographic Names Online
Map of Gum Stump

Unincorporated communities in Centre County, Pennsylvania
Unincorporated communities in Pennsylvania